The Redlands Unified School District serves the cities of Redlands and Loma Linda, the unincorporated community of Mentone, the eastern half of Highland and a small section of San Bernardino in San Bernardino County.  Total enrollment was 21,170 in 2009.  The district has 16 elementary schools that serve kindergarten through fifth grade, with five middle schools serving grades six through eight.  The district has six high schools.

Elementary schools

Middle schools (junior high)

High schools

eAcademy  
The Redlands eAcademy is a RUSD on-line school.  The school features a blended learning environment and serves grades K-12.  The school opened in August 2013.

Future expansion 
In Loma Linda, plans are underway for a new school, Benjamin Barton Middle School, to be built.

Controversy
In 2015, Redlands East Valley High School 2014 varsity cheerleaders were criticized for dressing up in costume gang attire with fake weaponry inside the school's gymnasium depicting a supposed "Latino Gang". The photo showed the High School students dressed in baggy jeans, heavy makeup and throwing gang signs.

In July 2020, Redlands City Council declared racism as a public health crises after some residents shared experiences of racial slurs and name calling at local schools and in the community.

In December 2020, Redlands Unified responded to a viral video depicting one of their students making a facial gesture targeted at the Asian community.

From as early as 1995, the district has also had a vast over-representation, for a district of its  size, of child molestation cases. This includes criminal cases involving Redlands teachers Lopez, Whitehurst, Kirkland, Koonce, Kelly, among others, and is an on-going problem with screening and grooming in the district. To date, the district has paid out over 50 million in damages to affected students and families.

References

 
School districts in San Bernardino County, California